Brachymesia is a genus of dragonflies in the family Libellulidae. They are commonly known as tropical pennants.

One species, B. gravida is confined to the United States. The others occur over much of South America, the West Indies and southern USA states.

Species
The genus contains the following species:

References

Libellulidae
Anisoptera genera
Odonata of North America
Odonata of South America
Insects of Central America
Insects of the Caribbean
Taxa named by William Forsell Kirby